Jesper Verlaat (born 4 June 1996) is a Dutch professional footballer who plays as a centre-back for  side 1860 Munich. Having come through the youth ranks of Werder Bremen, he began his professional career with the club's reserves. He is the son of former Dutch footballer Frank Verlaat, who also played for Bremen.

Career
Verlaat, who can be mobilised both in midfield and in central defence, began his career at FC Oberneuland before moving to the youth academy of Admira Wacker in 2003. Subsequently, Verlaat played at Sturm Graz. When his parents relocated to Algarve, Portugal in 2007, Verlaat played for various Portuguese teams until Verlaat moved to Werder Bremen in summer 2012 after a trial with the U-17s.

On 13 March 2015, Verlaat made his debut for Werder Bremen's reserves, coming on as a substitute for Onur Capin just before the end against TSV Havelse. In the summer he permanently became part of the second team, which had been promoted to the 3. Liga. He made his 3. Liga debut on 1 November 2015 as a substitute in the 29th minute in the 3–2 home win against Chemnitzer FC. Since then Verlaat became a regular player. His first goal for the second team came on 7 November 2015, during the 2–1 away defeat against Fortuna Köln. In May 2018, following Werder Bremen II's relegation from the 3. Liga, it was announced Verlaat would be one of ten players to leave the club.

In June 2018, Verlaat joined 2. Bundesliga side SV Sandhausen on a two-year contract.

Verlaat joined 3. Liga side Waldhof Mannheim in July 2020.

On 31 May 2022, Verlaat signed with 1860 Munich.

References

External links
 

1996 births
Living people
Footballers from Zaanstad
Association football defenders
Dutch footballers
FC Admira Wacker Mödling players
SK Sturm Graz players
SV Werder Bremen II players
SV Sandhausen players
SV Waldhof Mannheim players
3. Liga players
2. Bundesliga players
Regionalliga players
Dutch expatriate footballers
Dutch expatriate sportspeople in Germany
Expatriate footballers in Germany
Dutch expatriate sportspeople in Austria
Expatriate footballers in Austria
Dutch expatriate sportspeople in Portugal
Expatriate footballers in Portugal